Royal King's Park Tennis Club, founded in 1899, is located in Kings Park, Western Australia.  It was originally called the Mount Tennis Club and included two asphalt courts. Later, lawn tennis, bowls and croquet facilities were added.

The members' pavilion was built in 1926 and the McGibbon stand built in 1935.  A new building opened in 2007 and includes social facilities as well as a gymnasium, squash courts and swimming pools.

The club has seen numerous Davis Cup ties played there, most recently in 2004 when the Australian team of Lleyton Hewitt, Wayne Arthurs and Todd Woodbridge played Morocco in a world group qualifying match. The 1971 Federation Cup was held there. In November 2011 it was announced the club was in contention for a Switzerland-Australia Davis Cup tie.

Currently, the club features 22 grass courts, 2 synthetic and 6 hard courts.  It is operated by Next Generation Australia, a health and fitness company.

References

1899 establishments in Australia
Sports clubs established in 1899
Sports organizations established in 1899
Tennis in Western Australia
Organisations based in Australia with royal patronage
Commonwealth Games wrestling venues
1962 British Empire and Commonwealth Games venues
Tennis venues in Australia
Tennis clubs